STV is Estonian cable television company founded in 1991 and located in Tallinn, Estonia.

Subdivisions 
 STV AS (or just STV) – DVB-C/cable television, Internet service provider main company
 STV Telekanal – TV channel
 STV Turvateenistus – Security service

External links
 STV website

References 

Telecommunications companies of Estonia
Telecommunications companies established in 1991
1991 establishments in Estonia
Companies based in Tallinn